Vincent Edwards, Vincent Edward  or Vince Edwards may refer to the following:

Vince Edwards (1928–1996), American actor, director, and singer
Vincent Edwards (basketball) (born 1996), American basketball player
J. Vincent Edwards (born 1947), British singer

See also
Vincent Edward "Bo" Jackson
Vincent Edward Scully